Vikun Taak is a 2020 Indian Marathi-language slapstick comedy-drama film directed by Sameer Patil and produced by Uttung Hitendra Thakur, under the banner of Viva Inen. The film stars Chunky Pandey,  Shivraj Vaychal, Hrishikesh Joshi and Sameer Chougule. The film was released on 14 February 2020.

Premise
A mechanic from Dubai returns to India to get married. However, he faces a lot of problems when his wedding gets cancelled after the bank seizes his property because of a loan his father took.

Cast 

 Chunky Pandey as Abdul Lathif
 Shivraj Vaychal
 Radha Sagar as Dhani
 Rohit Mane
 Hrishikesh Joshi as Inspector Dongre
 Sameer Chougule
 Varsha Dandale as Aai
 Aditi Yevale

Production

Music

The music of the film is composed by Amitraj.

Release 
The film was released on 14 February 2020.

References

External links 

 

2020 films
Indian comedy-drama films
2020s Marathi-language films
2020 comedy-drama films